The 2013 World Women's Curling Championship (branded as the Titlis Glacier Mountain World Women's Curling Championship 2013 for sponsorship reasons) was held at the Volvo Sports Centre in Riga, Latvia from March 16 to 24. It marked the first time that Latvia has hosted the World Women's Championship. This event was also a qualifying event for the 2014 Winter Olympics, awarding points to countries based on performance at the worlds.

Scotland's Eve Muirhead won the event, becoming the youngest skip to ever win the women's curling championship at 22 years of age. She edged Sweden's Margaretha Sigfridsson, the previous year's silver medallist, in the final with a score of 6–5. Canada's Rachel Homan won the bronze medal after defeating Erika Brown of the United States with a score of 8–6.

Qualification
The following nations qualified to participate in the 2013 World Women's Curling Championship:
 (host country)
Two teams from the Americas zone

 (given that no challenges in the Americas zone were issued)
Seven teams from the 2012 European Curling Championships

Two teams from the 2012 Pacific-Asia Curling Championships

Teams
With Mirjam Ott's Swiss rink losing in the Swiss Championships, there was no defending team at the 2013 Women's Worlds. Representing Switzerland instead was 1999 World Junior champion Silvana Tirinzoni. Returning from the 2012 World championships was the Margaretha Sigfridsson rink, who won silver in 2012 as well as in 2002 and 2009. The team was selected by the Swedish Curling Association, despite losing to Anette Norberg in the Swedish final, feeling that they would be a better representative. Also returning from 2012 was 2009 World Champion Wang Bingyu of China, 2-time European bronze medalist Lene Nielsen of Denmark, 2006 European silver medalist Diana Gaspari of Italy, reigning European champion Anna Sidorova of Russia and four-time World Junior champion Eve Muirhead of Scotland. Also, two-time world champion Andrea Schöpp of Germany, whose team represented Germany in 2012 is also returning, having missed the 2012 tournament due to a leg injury. Making her seventh appearance at the Worlds is U.S. skip, Erika Brown, who is a two-time world silver medalist. The host Latvian team was skipped by Iveta Staša-Šaršūne who finished last in her lone appearance in 2010. Making their World debuts was Canadian skip Rachel Homan, the 2010 World Junior silver medalist and Japanese skip Satsuki Fujisawa who is a two-time Pacific Junior champion. 
 
The teams are listed as follows:

Round robin standings
Final Round Robin Standings

Round robin results
All draw times are listed in Eastern European Time (UTC+2).

Draw 1
Saturday, March 16, 14:00

Draw 2
Saturday, March 16, 19:00

Draw 3
Sunday, March 17, 9:00

Draw 4
Sunday, March 17, 14:00

Draw 5
Sunday, March 17, 19:00

Draw 6
Monday, March 18, 8:30

Draw 7
Monday, March 18, 13:30

Draw 8
Monday, March 18, 18:30

Draw 9
Tuesday, March 19, 8:30

Draw 10
Tuesday, March 19, 13:30

Draw 11
Tuesday, March 19, 18:30

Draw 12
Wednesday, March 20, 8:30

Draw 13
Wednesday, March 20, 13:30

Draw 14
Wednesday, March 20, 18:30

Draw 15
Thursday, March 21, 8:30

Draw 16
Thursday, March 21, 13:30

Draw 17
Thursday, March 21, 18:30

Tiebreakers

Friday, March 22, 9:00

Friday, March 22, 14:00

Playoffs

1 vs. 2
Friday, March 22, 19:00

3 vs. 4
Saturday, March 23, 14:00

Semifinal
Saturday, March 23, 19:00

Bronze medal game
Sunday, March 24, 9:00

Gold medal game
Sunday, March 24, 14:00

Statistics

Top 5 player percentages
Round robin only

References
General

Specific

External links

World Women's Curling Championship
World Women's Curling Championship
Qualification events for the 2014 Winter Olympics
Curling
International curling competitions hosted by Latvia
Sports competitions in Riga
World Women's Curling
2010s in Riga